Robert Hill Hanna  (6 August 1886 – 15 June 1967), was a Presbyterian Irish-born naturalised immigrant to Canada. He was a soldier in the Canadian Expeditionary Force and recipient of the Victoria Cross, the highest and most prestigious award for gallantry in the face of the enemy that can be awarded to British and Commonwealth forces.

Hanna joined the Canadian Expeditionary Force in November 1914. He was a Company Sergeant-Major in the 29th Battalion, CEF, Canadian Expeditionary Force during the First World War when the following deed took place during the Battle of Hill 70 for which he was awarded the Victoria Cross. The citation published in the London Gazette, of November 8, 1917, detailed the event as follows:-

On August 21, 1917, at Hill 70 Lens, France, Company Sergeant-Major Hanna's company met with most severe enemy resistance at a heavily protected strong point, which had beaten off three assaults and all the officers of the company had become casualties. This warrant officer, under heavy machine-gun and rifle fire, coolly collected and led a party against the strong point, rushed through the wire and personally killed four of the enemy, capturing the position and silencing the machine-gun. This courageous action was responsible for the capture of a most important tactical point.

Hanna was decorated for his courageous actions with the Victoria Cross by His Majesty King George V, at a ceremony held at Buckingham Palace on December 5, 1917. He later achieved the rank of lieutenant.

He was born near Hanna's Close in Kilkeel, County Down, in the province of Ulster in Ireland, near to the Mourne Mountains. His personal sword is on the wall of Kilkeel Royal British Legion club. In Kilkeel he belonged to Aughnahoory Loyal Orange Lodge No 343  and upon moving to Canada he joined the Orange Order in Canada Vancouver based Ontario L.O.L. No. 2226.

He died in Mount Lehman, British Columbia, Canada on 15 June 1967. Hanna is buried at the Masonic Cemetery, Burnaby, British Columbia (plot 49, section C, grave 2).

References

Further reading 
Listed in order of publication year 
The Register of the Victoria Cross (1981, 1988 and 1997)

Ireland's VCs (Dept of Economic Development, 1995)
Monuments to Courage (David Harvey, 1999)
Irish Winners of the Victoria Cross (Richard Doherty & David Truesdale, 2000)

External links
 Robert Hill Hanna's digitized service file
 Robert Hill Hanna biography on DND's Directorate of History and Heritage
  VC Burials - Canada - British Columbia
 
 Legion Magazine Article on Robert Hill Hanna
 

1886 births
1967 deaths
Canadian Expeditionary Force officers
Canadian people of Ulster-Scottish descent
Canadian World War I recipients of the Victoria Cross
Irish emigrants to Canada (before 1923)
Military personnel from County Down
Naturalized citizens of Canada
People from Kilkeel